Phalonidia fulvimixta is a species of moth of the family Tortricidae. It is found in Primorsky Krai in the Russian Far East and in China.

References

Moths described in 1940
Phalonidia